The Thule or proto-Inuit were the ancestors of all modern Inuit. They developed in coastal Alaska by the year 1000 and expanded eastward across northern Canada, reaching Greenland by the 13th century. In the process, they replaced people of the earlier Dorset culture that had previously inhabited the region. The appellation "Thule" originates from the location of Thule (relocated and renamed Qaanaaq in 1953) in northwest Greenland, facing Canada, where the archaeological remains of the people were first found at Comer's Midden. The links between the Thule and the Inuit are biological, cultural, and linguistic.

Evidence supports the idea that the Thule (and also the Dorset, but to a lesser degree) were in contact with the Vikings, who had reached the shores of Canada in the 11th century as part of Norse colonization of North America. In Viking sources, these peoples are called the Skrælingjar. Some Thule migrated southward, in the "Second Expansion" or "Second Phase". By the 13th or 14th century, the Thule had occupied an area inhabited until then by the Central Inuit, and by the 15th century, the Thule replaced the Dorset. Intensified contacts with Europeans began in the 18th century. Compounded by the already disruptive effects of the "Little Ice Age" (1650–1850), the Thule communities broke apart, and the people were henceforward known as the Eskimo, and later, Inuit.

History

The Thule Tradition lasted from about 200 BC to 1600 AD around the Bering Strait, the Thule people being the prehistoric ancestors of the Inuit. Thule culture was mapped out by Therkel Mathiassen, following his participation as an archaeologist and cartographer of the Fifth Danish Expedition to Arctic America in 1921–1924. He excavated sites on Baffin Island and the northwestern Hudson Bay region, which he considered to be the remains of a highly developed Eskimo whaling culture that had originated in Alaska and moved to Arctic Canada approximately 1000 years ago.  There are three stages of development leading up to Thule culture; they are Okvik/Old Bering Sea, Punuk, Birnirk, and then Thule culture. These groups of peoples have been referred to as "Neo-Eskimo" cultures, which are differentiated from the earlier Norton Tradition.

There are several stages of the Thule tradition: Old Bering Sea Stage, Punuk Stage, and Birnirk Stage. These stages represent variations of the Thule Tradition as it expanded over time. The Thule Tradition replaced the Dorset Tradition in the Eastern Arctic and introduced both kayaks and umiaks, or skin covered boats, into the archaeological record as well as developed new uses for iron and copper and demonstrated advanced harpoon technology and use of bowhead whales, the largest animal in the Arctic. and spread across the coasts of Labrador and Greenland. It is the most recent "neo-Eskimo" culture.

Old Bering Sea stage, 200 BC to AD 500

The Old Bering Sea (OBS) stage was first characterized by Diamond Jenness, on the basis of a collection of deeply patinated decorated ivory harpoon heads and other objects dug up by natives on the St. Lawrence and Diomede Islands.  Jenness identified the Bering Sea culture as a highly developed Inuit culture of northeastern Asiatic origin and pre-Thule in age.

A strong maritime adaptation is characteristic of the Thule, and the OBS stage, and then can be seen in the archaeological evidence. Both Kayaks and umiaks (large skinned boats) appear in the archaeological record for the first time. The toolkits of the people of the time are dominated by polished-slate rather than flaked-stone artifacts, including lanceolate knives, projectile heads, and the ulu transverse-bladed knife. The people also made a crude form of pottery and there was much use of bone and antlers for heads on harpoons, as well as to make darts, spears, snow goggles, blubber scrapers, needles, awls and mattocks, also walrus shoulder-blade snow shovels.

There are many important innovations that emerged that allowed hunting to be more efficient. Harpoon mounted ice picks were used for seal hunting, as well as ivory plugs and mouthpieces for inflating harpoon line floats, which enabled them to recover larger sea mammals when dispatched. These people relied heavily on seal and walrus for subsistence. It is easy to pick out OBS technology because of the artistic curvilinear dots, circles, and shorter lines that were used to decorate their tools.

The chronological relationship between the Okvik and Old Bering Seas cultures has been the subject of debate and remains largely undecided, based mainly on art styles. Some consider it to be a distinct culture pre-dating Old Bering Sea, but the close similarity and overlapping radiocarbon dates suggest Okvik and Old Bering Sea are best considered as roughly contemporaneous, with regional variants.

Punuk and Birnirk stages, c. 800 to 1400
The Punuk stage is a development of Old Bering Sea stage, with distribution along the major Strait islands and along to shores of the Chukchi Peninsula. Later excavation on St Lawrence Island confirmed Jenness's ideas on the Bering Sea culture, and demonstrated a continual cultural sequence on the island from Old Bering Sea, to Punuk, to modern Eskimo culture.

Punuk is differentiated with Old Bering Sea through its artifact styles and house forms, as well as harpoon styles and whale hunting. Punuk settlements were larger and more common than earlier villages. They were subterranean, square or rectangular dwellings with wooden floors. The house was held up by whale jaw-bones, and covered in skins, sod and then snow. These houses were nicely insulated, and would have been only visible to the occupants.

Whaling has a greater emphasis in the Punuk stage. Hunters would use umiaks and kill whales in narrow ice leads as well as in the open sea in the fall. Open sea whaling required skilled leadership, teams of expert boatmen and hunters, and the cooperation of several boats. The whaleboat captain, the umialik, is still a prominent position in Arctic communities today. Chipped stone tools were replaced by ground slate, ivory winged tolls were largely replaced by tridents, and iron-tipped tools were used for engraving. Harpoon styles became simpler and more standardised, as did Punuk art.  The Punuk developed their methods of hunting that led to the creation of armor made from bone as well as the technology of the bow and arrow. As well, bone plated wrist guards, the reinforced bow, bird bola, heavy ivory net sinkers, and blunt tipped bird arrows appeared in the Punuk stage.

Birnirk culture is best known along coastal northern and western Alaska. There are three phases of Birnirk culture: Early Birnirk, Middle Birnirk, and Late Birnirk. These phases were primarily distinguishable by gradual changes in harpoon head and arrow styles. Harpoon heads were more often made of antler, rather than ivory, and were characterized by medially-placed, trifurcated spurs during Early Birnirk, bifurcated in Middle Birnirk, and single-laterally-placed spurs in Late Birnirk.

The Birnirk people used many of the same hunting methods and technology as Punuk and Old Bering Sea, but there was no art. There is very little evidence of tool or weapon decoration. The little art that was present in the Birnirk stage was limited to spiral and concentric motifs on clay pots with bone paddles. They did use sledges, of the same basic design as were later used with dog teams. Birnirk people were sea-mammal hunters who engaged in fishing and whaling. Birnirk houses were square shaped, with walls constructed of horizontal logs and single or double posts in each corner. Sleeping areas were at the back of the dwelling and were either built up or at floor level. No interior hearths were found in the house ruins, although heavily encrusted and fire-blackened pottery vessel fragments suggest extensive use of open fires.

Classic Thule, 1100 to 1400
During this time, eastern Thule spread out throughout the High Arctic and into the south. Thule people were living along the Hudson Strait coasts, in the Hudson Bay region, on the shores of the Foxe Basin, and along the present-day Canadian mainland from the Mackenzie Delta to the Melville Peninsula. The archaeologist Alan McCartney originally coined the term "Classic Thule" with reference to the population that existed between 1100 and 1400 AD.

The Thule people still lived in semi-subterranean winter houses, but in the summer moved into skin tents, the edges held down by circles of stone. The Thule were using iron long before European contact. In the west it was used in small quantities for carving knives and for engraving other tools. The iron came both from meteoric resources and from trade from the Norse expansion; Thule people used the metal to form projectile points through a process called epi-metallurgy, which made stronger, harder, more efficient points. Iron enabled the Thule people to work with more materials to make more wood and bone tools. The only problem they faced was a lack of a steady supply of metal. The Thule were clever with technology. Reports on classic Thule sites lists myriad artifacts used for hunting. Classic Thule did not place much emphasis on art. There were slight artistic details on household things such as combs but it involved very simple, linear designs featuring people without appendages, animals, or symbols that represented the human ties with the supernatural world.

Post-Classic Thule, 1400 to European contact
Post-Classic Thule tradition existed from 1400 up until European contact in areas where whales were not as prevalent so there is an increase in evidence of other means of subsistence, such as caribou, seal and fish. These settlements show a more gradual settlement of fewer whales and using more subsistence strategies from the west. The redistribution of the Thule people reflects the population pressures of the Classic Thule, but the climate played a more important role. The onset of the "Little Ice Age" that occurred between 1400 and 1600 limited the use of boats and number of whales present in the area. This shortened the season for open-water whale hunting. By the 16th century, umiak and kayak whale hunting had ceased in the High Arctic. By 1600, the people had moved on and abandoned the High Arctic due to the severe climate changes. The Thule Eskimos who lived near open water were not as affected by the decrease in temperature. It was during this time that local groups such as the Copper Inuit, Netsilingmuit, and Inglulingmuit emerged.

Thule expansion into the West and Eastern Arctic
Between 900 and 1100, the Thule Tradition spread westward. The efficiency of housing was improved as they spread to the west and hunting methods were improved due to the use of dog sleds, umiaks, and kayaks. This enabled the hunters to travel further to hunt and follow the migration of the large game and sea mammals. After 1000, the practice of using polished slate for tool making continued to spread to the Aleutian Islands. The methods of pottery making also spread and replaced the Norton tradition in Southern Alaska. There were differences between the areas to which the tradition migrated. Houses in the more eastern region were more above ground and round with stone platforms to sleep on. The shape and support for the buildings came from whale bones. Eastern populations preferred soapstone domestic items instead of pottery and developed the use of dogs to pull sleds.

Sometime around the beginning of the 2nd millennium, Thule people began migrating east. As western Thule peoples settled the northern and western coasts of Alaska, other Thule groups migrated eastward across the Canadian Arctic as far as Greenland. Prior to 1000, the central and eastern Canadian Arctic were occupied by people of the Dorset Culture. Within a few centuries, Dorset culture was completely displaced by Thule immigrants from the west. Evidence of contact between Dorset and Thule peoples is scarce and the nature of the Dorset/Thule succession remains poorly understood.

Thule culture was first identified in the Eastern Arctic by interdisciplinary researches of Danish scholars between 1921 and 1924. A team of anthropologists, archaeologists and natural scientists compiled a massive description of the Canadian Arctic on the fifth Thule expedition. Therkel Mathiassen added upon their research and claimed that the tradition had started out in Alaska, and that Thule hunting was based on the dog sled, the large skin boat and the kayak which enabled them to range over a much greater hunting territory, participate in widespread trade, and transport heavier loads. Mathiassen was right about his hypotheses and even mapped out the Thule migration and interaction with Greenland.

There are many different theories as to why the Thule moved out of the Bering Strait. One is the cultural-ecological model developed by R. McGhee. The idea is that the first Thule families to move followed groups of bowhead whales, which were an important source of food, fuel and raw materials. The onset of the Neo-Atlantic climatic episode, a warming trend which occurred between 900 and 1200 in the northern hemisphere, resulted in the lengthened season of open water along the North Alaskan Coast, and an extension of the summer range of bowhead whales into the Beaufort Sea and further east into the Canadian Archipelago. Like other whale species, bowheads tend to avoid ice-choked channels and passages because of the possibility of entrapment and death. General climatic warming may have reduced the extent and severity of pack ice, allowing bowheads and their Thule predators to expand eastward.

Another theory is that warfare in Alaska or a desire to seek out new resources of iron for making tools such as knives may have encouraged people to move eastward. Archaeologists have used the distribution of early Alaskan-style harpoon heads to track the routes taken by Thule people. One route follows the Beaufort Sea coast and Amundsen Gulf, entering the High Arctic via Parry Channel and Smith Sound. A second route led the Thule south, along the western coast of Hudson Bay.

Culture

The culture of the Thule people varied greatly from the Dorset. Their success in hunting bowhead whales was facilitated through their use of large boats, and their vast foraging range through the use of dog sleds. In prime whaling areas, known Thule sites regularly contain fifteen to twenty houses, and in one case sixty. Clusters of houses suggest extended family units, and communal structures dedicated to ceremony have also been identified. Some form of hierarchical social structure may be identifiable though variations in dwelling size, form, and content (whaling equipment, non-local goods, etc.) which could point to a difference in social status between families or households. The presence of small quantities of native copper from the western arctic and meteoric iron from north-west Greenland indicate the existence of trade networks taking place in Thule culture.

Tools
The different stages of the Thule Tradition are distinguished by their different styles of making tools and art. The later stages, Punuk and Birnirk, have greater representation in the archaeological record and are said to have spread further and lasted longer than their predecessor, the Old Bering Sea Stage.  The Thule people are well known for their technological advances in transportation and hunting techniques and tools. The harpoon played a very significant role in whaling and the Thule people made several types of harpoon points out of whale bone. They also made inflated harpoon line floats to help them hunt larger prey. Where available, they used and traded iron from meteorites such as the Cape York meteorite.

Subsistence

The Classic Thule tradition relied heavily on the bowhead whale for survival because bowhead whales swim slowly and sleep near the water's surface. Bowhead whales served many purposes for the Thule people. The people could get a lot of meat for food, blubber for oil that could be used for fires for light and cooking purposes, and the bones could be used for building structures and making tools.  The Thule people survived predominantly on fish, large sea mammals and caribou outside of the whaling communities. Because they had advanced transportation technology, they had access to a wider range of food sources. There is superb faunal preservation in Thule sites due to a late prehistoric date as well as an arctic environment. Most of the bowhead artifacts were harvested from live bowhead whales. The Thule developed an expertise in hunting and utilizing as many parts of an animal as possible. This knowledge combined with their growing wealth of tools and modes of transportation allowed the Thule people to thrive. They whaled together where one person would shoot the whale with the harpoon and the others would throw the floats on it and they all transferred the whale to land to butcher it together to share with the entire community. Their unity played a significant role in the length of time they thrived in the Arctic.

Thule sites and projects
There are several major archaeological research projects that have been conducted on the Thule culture at sites including Torngat Archaeological Project, Somerset Island, The Clachan site, Coronation Gulf, Nelson River, Baffin Island, Victoria Island, the Bell site, Devon Island – QkHn-12, and Cape York.

Genetics

A genetic study published in Science in August 2014 examined the remains of a large number of Thule people buried between ca. 1050 AD and 1600 AD. The examined individuals belonged overwhelmingly to the maternal haplogroup A2a, while samples of A, A2b and D3a2a were also detected. It was found that the Thule people probably descended from the Birnirk culture of Siberia, and that they were genetically very different from the indigenous Dorset people of northern Canada and Greenland, whom they culturally and genetically completely replaced around 1300 AD. The study found no evidence of genetic mixing between the Thule people and Greenlandic Norse people.

See also 
 Saqqaq culture
 Qilakitsoq

References

Sources

Further reading 
 Bonvillain, Nancy. The Inuit. Chelsea House Publishers, 1995
 Dumond, Don. The Eskimos and Aleuts. Westview Press, 1977
 Schledermann, Peter. The Thule Tradition in Northern Labrador. Memorial University of Newfoundland, 1971
 Tuck, James. Newfoundland and Labrador Prehistory. Van Nostrand Reinhold, 1984
 History of the Thule Migration,  The Nature of Things, Canadian Broadcasting Corporation.  Informational webpage related to the TV documentary, Inuit Odyssey, shown below in the External links section.

External links 

 Inuit Odyssey, produced by The Nature of Things and first broadcast 29 June 2009 on the Canadian Broadcasting Corporation. This is a documentary on the Thule people and their eastward migration across the Arctic to Greenland.  The webpage contains a link to view the documentary  online here (length:  44:32; may not be viewable online outside of Canada). Note: Nature of Things episodes are also viewable on iTunes, and can be purchased at the CBC's online shop.

Inuit history
Archaeological cultures of North America
Greenlandic Inuit people
Native American history of Alaska
Prehistory of the Arctic
1st millennium in Greenland
2nd millennium in Canada

de:Inuit-Kultur#Kulturgeschichtlicher Überblick